This is a list of seasons played by Oiartzun KE, a Spanish women's football  club from Oiartzun that has been active since the 1980s.

Summary

References

Oiartzun KE
Oiartzun KE
Association football lists by Spanish club